Victoria Kaminskaya (born 7 October 1995) is a Portuguese swimmer who competed in the women's 200 and 400 metre individual medley events at the 2016 Summer Olympics. On 4 May 2018 it was announced that the multiple Portuguese record holder would be representing Benfica.

References

External links
 

1995 births
Living people
People from Bryansk
Portuguese people of Russian descent
Portuguese female medley swimmers
Olympic swimmers of Portugal
Swimmers at the 2016 Summer Olympics
S.L. Benfica (swimming)
Swimmers at the 2018 Mediterranean Games
Mediterranean Games competitors for Portugal